was a  after Jōryaku and before Ōtoku. This period spanned the years from February 1081 through April 1084.

Change of Era
 February 12, 1081 : The new era name was created to mark an event or series of events. The previous era ended and the new one commenced in Jōryaku 5, on the 10th day of the 2nd month of 1081.

Events of the Eihō Era
 May 26, 1081 (Eihō 1, 15th day of the 4th month):  The Buddhist Temple of Miidera was set on fire by the monks of a rival sect on Mt. Hiei.
 July 12, 1081 (Eihō 1, 4th day of the 6th month): Miidera was burned again by monks from Mt. Hiei.
 1083 (Eihō 3, 10th month): At Hosshō-ji, construction begins on a nine-story pagoda.

Notes

References
 Brown, Delmer M. and Ichirō Ishida, eds. (1979).  Gukanshō: The Future and the Past. Berkeley: University of California Press. ;  OCLC 251325323
 Nussbaum, Louis-Frédéric and Käthe Roth. (2005).  Japan encyclopedia. Cambridge: Harvard University Press. ;  OCLC 58053128
 Titsingh, Isaac. (1834). Nihon Odai Ichiran; ou,  Annales des empereurs du Japon.  Paris: Royal Asiatic Society, Oriental Translation Fund of Great Britain and Ireland. OCLC 5850691
 Varley, H. Paul. (1980). A Chronicle of Gods and Sovereigns: Jinnō Shōtōki of Kitabatake Chikafusa. New York: Columbia University Press. ;  OCLC 6042764

External links
 National Diet Library, "The Japanese Calendar" -- historical overview plus illustrative images from library's collection

Japanese eras